Blandburg is an unincorporated community and census-designated place (CDP) in Reade Township, Cambria County, Pennsylvania, United States, located along Pennsylvania Route 865 in far northeastern Cambria County. As of the 2010 census, the population was 402 residents.

Demographics

References

Census-designated places in Cambria County, Pennsylvania
Census-designated places in Pennsylvania